Wendell Gilley was a bird watcher and artist who carved birds in wood on Mount Desert Island, Maine. He started out carving two-inch wooden birds for Abercrombie & Fitch.

Wendell Gilley Museum
The Wendell Gilley Museum in Southwest Harbor, Maine, which opened in July 1981, displays hundreds of examples of Gilley's work.  The museum also features works by other woodcarvers, including a collection of miniature waterfowl by the Cape Cod carver who inspired Gilley, A. Elmer Crowell.

External links
 The Wendell Gilley Museum of Bird Carving

American woodcarvers
People from Mount Desert Island
Artists from Maine
Museums in Hancock County, Maine
Art museums and galleries in Maine
Decorative arts museums in the United States